U.S. Route 98 (US 98) is an east–west United States Highway in the Southeastern United States that runs from western Mississippi to southern Florida. It was established in 1933 as a route between Pensacola and Apalachicola, Florida, and has since been extended westward into Mississippi and eastward across the Florida Peninsula. It runs along much of the Gulf Coast between Mobile, Alabama, and Crystal River, Florida, including extensive sections closely following the coast between Mobile and St. Marks, Florida. The highway's western terminus is with US 84 in Natchez, Mississippi. Its eastern terminus is Palm Beach, Florida, at State Road A1A (SR A1A) near the Mar-a-Lago resort.

Route description
U.S. 98's western terminus is in Mississippi, and its eastern terminus is in Florida. Much of its route through Alabama and Florida falls within coastal counties.

Mississippi
U.S. 98 enters the state from the southeast and immediately widens to four lanes. It bypasses Lucedale to the north, and an interchange with Mississippi Highway 63 provides four-laned access to Pascagoula on the Mississippi Gulf Coast, increasing road capacity for hurricane evacuations. At Hattiesburg, an interchange with U.S. Route 49 provides four-laned access to Gulfport (to the south) and Jackson (to the north). The road continues west from its intersection with U.S. 49 to Interstate 59 at Exit 59, with which it is concurrent through Exit 65 (Hardy Street). The highway runs westward through Columbia before meeting U.S. 51 in McComb. It then joins Interstate 55 from Exit 15 (South McComb) to Exit 20 (Summit). The last remaining two-laned section of U.S. 98 in Mississippi then runs northwestward to its terminus near Bude in Meadville at US 84.

U.S. 98 serves as a primary hurricane evacuation route in southern Mississippi, connecting cities along the Mississippi Sound to inland destinations further north.

The Mississippi section of U.S. 98 is defined in Mississippi Code Annotated § 65-3-3.

Alabama

In Alabama, US 98 is paired with unsigned State Route 42 (SR 42). The route enters Alabama from the east near Lillian in rural Baldwin County.  At Daphne, US 98 begins a concurrency with US 90. US 90 and 98 junction I-10 at Daphne on the eastern shore of Mobile Bay, then again on the western side of the bay as they enter downtown Mobile. As the two routes approach the Mobile River, US 98 is split into two routes, with a US 98 Truck route crossing the Mobile River via the Cochrane–Africatown USA Bridge, co-signed with US 90. Passenger car traffic passes directly into town under the Mobile River via the Bankhead Tunnel. Once the truck route rejoins the main route in downtown Mobile, US 98 assumes a northwestward trajectory, and enters Mississippi near the community of Wilmer in western Mobile County. US 98 is the southern terminus of two major U.S. highways: US 31, at Spanish Fort, and US 45 in Mobile.
The safety of the route, or the lack thereof, has earned the road the nickname "Bloody 98". A plan to remediate the problem has not been adopted, and is hampered by the financial damage imposed to road repairs by higher vehicle fuel efficiency (as gas taxes largely go to road repair) and the diversion of roadway funds to other projects like greenways and public transportation. Also, environmentalists have gone to court on numerous occasions to block proposals to turn the stretch of US 98 from the Alabama–Mississippi line to the town of Semmes, Alabama, into a four-lane, fearing that construction runoff would cause contamination of Big Creek Lake (where Mobile gets its municipal water supply) and its surrounding wetlands.

Florida

Within Florida, US 98 is marked as an east–west road from the Alabama-Florida border to Perry. Throughout the rest of the state, the road is marked as a north–south road.

Concurrencies include US 441 from Royal Palm Beach to Okeechobee, US 27 from South Sebring to West Frostproof, US 17 from Fort Meade to Bartow, US 301 from Clinton Heights to Moss Town, SR 50 from Ridge Manor to Brooksville, SR 50A then US 41 in Brooksville, US 19 from Chassahowitzka to Perry, ALT US 27 from Chiefland to Perry, US 319 in Medart and from St. Theresa to Port St. Joe, and US 90 in Pensacola. The hidden designation for most of US 98 across the panhandle of the state of Florida is State Route 30. Between Chassahowitzka and Palm Beach, the hidden designation is State Route 700.
There is a 60 mph speed limit east of Tyndall Air Force Base outside of Panama City all the way to Perry.

History

US 98 was first commissioned in 1934. At that time, its entire route was within Florida, traveling from Pensacola to Apalachicola. In 1952, the eastern end was extended to its present terminus in Palm Beach, Florida. In 1955, the western terminus was extended westward to Natchez, Mississippi. In 1999, the western end of US 98 was truncated to its intersection with US 84 at Meadville, Mississippi, although it continued to be signed concurrently with US 84 to Washington, Mississippi until 2008.

Major intersections
Mississippi
  in Meadville.
  in Summit. The highways travel concurrently to McComb.
  in McComb
  in Hattiesburg. The highways travel concurrently to south of Hattiesburg.
  in Hattiesburg
  in Hattiesburg
Alabama
  in Mobile
  in Mobile
  in Mobile. The highways travel concurrently through Mobile.
  in Mobile. The highways travel concurrently to Spanish Fort.
  in Mobile
  in Spanish Fort
  in Daphne. US 90/US 98 travels concurrently through Daphne.
Florida
  in Pensacola. The highways travel concurrently through Pensacola.
  in Pensacola
  in Pensacola
  southeast of Santa Rosa Beach
  in Panama City
  east of Apalachicola. The highways travel concurrently to west-southwest of St. Teresa.
  in Medart. The highways travel concurrently to north-northeast of Medart.
  in Perry. US 19/US 98 travels concurrently to northeast of Chassahowitzka.
  in Perry
  in Chiefland
  in Brooksville. The highways travel concurrently through Brooksville.
  west-northwest of Ridge Manor
  in Lacoochee. The highways travel concurrently to south of Dade City.
  in Lakeland
  in Lakeland
  in Bartow. The highways travel concurrently to Fort Meade.
  east of West Frostproof. The highways travel concurrently to west-southwest of Spring Lake.
  in Okeechobee. The highways travel concurrently to Royal Palm Beach.
  in West Palm Beach
  in West Palm Beach
  in Palm Beach

In popular culture
Blue Mountain recorded a song titled "Bloody 98," specifically referring to a two-laned section of the highway between Mobile, Alabama and Hattiesburg, Mississippi.

Special and suffixed routes

U.S. Route 98 Business in Pensacola, Florida
U.S. Route 98 Toll from Pensacola, Florida to Navarre, Florida
U.S. Route 98 Bypass in Panama City Beach, Florida
U.S. Route 98 Alternate in Panama City Beach, Florida
U.S. Route 98 Business in Panama City, Florida
U.S. Route 98 Truck in Brooksville, Florida
U.S. Route 98 Truck in Dade City, Florida
U.S. Route 98 Business in Dade City, Florida
U.S. Route 98 Business in Lakeland, Florida
U.S. Route 98 Business in Bartow, Florida
U.S Route 98 Alternate in Fairhope, Alabama

References

External links
Endpoints of U.S. Highway 98

 
98
98
98
098